Ricardo Macarrón Jaime (1926–2004), was a Spanish painter and portraitist. He is known for his court paintings for European royalty and portraits of aristocracy, including four generations of the House of Bourbon, and Victoria Eugenia of Battenberg.

Early life 
Ricardo Macarrón Jaime was born April 9, 1926 in Madrid, Spain. His father Juan Macarrón Despierto owned a workshop for art restorers and carvers.

Macarrón attended Real Academia de Bellas Artes de San Fernando, studying under . While he was a student he made his first portrait of artist Joaquín García Donaire in 1943. Macarrón won many art awards while he was a student. He met his future wife Alicia Iturrioz in college, where she also attended too. Together they had two daughters.

Career and late life 
He had three marked periods of style in his paintings – from 1955 to 1960 he was working with a cubist influence; from 1960 to 1968 his work was darker and emphasized "disenchantment"; and in later life in the 1990s the work reflected his strong technical skills and techniques. Macarrón had painted portraits of three Queens, Sofia of Spain, Elizabeth II of England, Noor of Jordan. Also notable is his 1961 portrait of Carmen Cervera.

Macarrón died on May 14, 2004 in Riaza, Spain. He was cremated and has a memorial in Almudena cemetery in Madrid. After Macarróns death, Iturrioz wrote the memoir Mi Vida con Ricardo Macarrón (2014) about their shared life experiences.

His work is found in public museum collections, including the Thyssen-Bornemisza Museum, and Biblioteca Museu Víctor Balaguer.

References 

1926 births
2004 deaths
Artists from Madrid
Real Academia de Bellas Artes de San Fernando alumni
Court painters
20th-century Spanish painters
20th-century Spanish male artists
Spanish male painters